Louis Grillot (18 April 1932 – 12 August 2022) was a French farmer and politician. A member of the Rally for the Republic and the Union for a Popular Movement, he served in the Senate from 1998 to 2008.

Grillot died in Beaune on 12 August 2022, at the age of 90.

References

1932 births
2022 deaths
French farmers
French politicians
French Senators of the Fifth Republic
Rally for the Republic politicians
Union for a Popular Movement politicians
Senators of Côte-d'Or
Senators of Saône-et-Loire
People from Le Creusot
20th-century French politicians
21st-century French politicians
20th-century farmers
21st-century farmers